Agnes is an unincorporated community in southern Laclede County, Missouri, United States. Agnes is located on State Route O on the west side of Cobb Creek and approximately three miles north of the Laclede-Wright County line.

History
A post office called Agnes was established in 1896, and remained in operation until 1933. The community was named after Agnes Handley, the wife of an early citizen.

In 1925, Agnes had 8 inhabitants.

References

Unincorporated communities in Laclede County, Missouri
Unincorporated communities in Missouri